The fourth season of Madam Secretary an American political drama television series originally aired in the United States on CBS from October 8, 2017, through May 20, 2018. This season was produced by CBS Television Studios, with Barbara Hall and Lori McCreary as showrunner and executive producer, respectively. Debuting on September 21, 2014. Madam Secretary was renewed for a fifth season on April 18, 2018.

Cast and characters

Main
 Téa Leoni as Dr. Elizabeth McCord, the United States Secretary of State
 Tim Daly as Dr. Henry McCord, Elizabeth's husband and a Central Intelligence Agency operative
 Keith Carradine as Conrad Dalton, President of the United States
 Erich Bergen as Blake Moran, Elizabeth's personal assistant
 Patina Miller as Daisy Grant, Elizabeth's press coordinator
 Geoffrey Arend as Matt Mahoney, Elizabeth's speechwriter
 Sebastian Arcelus as Jay Whitman, Elizabeth's policy advisor and later chief of staff
 Sara Ramirez as Kat Sandoval, Elizabeth's new policy advisor
 Kathrine Herzer as Alison McCord, Elizabeth and Henry's younger daughter
 Evan Roe as Jason McCord, Elizabeth and Henry's son
 Wallis Currie-Wood as Stephanie "Stevie" McCord, Elizabeth and Henry's older daughter; later, Dmitri's girlfriend
 Željko Ivanek as Russell Jackson, White House Chief of Staff
 Chris Petrovski as Dmitri Petrov, a former Russian spy who joins the Central Intelligence Agency to work for Henry
 Bebe Neuwirth as Nadine Tolliver, Elizabeth's chief of staff

Guests
 Morgan Freeman as Frawley, the Chief Justice of the United States
 Yuval David as Matvey Sokolov, a Russian special agent
 Christine Ebersole as Lydia Dalton, the first lady of the United States
 Keone Young as Minister Myambyn Sendoo
 Elpidia Carrillo as President Daphne Tejeda

Episodes

Production

Development
Madam Secretary was renewed for a fourth season on March 23, 2017.

Casting
Bebe Neuwirth left the cast after the third episode of the season. Sara Ramirez joined the cast as Kat Sandoval as a series regular. Hall said of Ramirez: "She brings a fresh perspective and a fun, energetic quality to the State Department staff."

Broadcast
Season four of Madam Secretary premiered on October 8, 2017.

Ratings

References

External links

2017 American television seasons
2018 American television seasons
Season 4